Friedrich Dickel (9 December 1913 – 23 October 1993) was a German politician, who served as the interior minister of East Germany for nearly twenty-six years.

Early life
Dickel was born on 9 December 1913 in Wuppertal-Vohwinkel in the Prussian Rhine Province of the German Empire.

Career
Dickel joined the Communist Party of Germany in 1931. He was a military officer with the rank of colonel general. He fought in the international brigades in the civil war of Spain together with others, including future Stasi chief Erich Mielke. Dickel commanded a platoon unit in the civil war in Spain.

After the Nazi rule in Germany, he settled in the Soviet Union where he taught at the Soviet General Staff Academy. He returned to East Germany in 1946 and served as the commander of the Officers’ School for Political Work in East Berlin from 1950. He was promoted to the rank of major general in 1956. Next year he was named as the deputy national defense minister.

Dickel became a member of the Socialist Unity Party of Germany (SED) and of its central committee. His tenure in the SED central committee was between 1967 and 1989. He also served as a police chief in East Berlin.

Dickel was appointed interior minister on 14 November 1963, replacing Karl Maron in the post. He also led the Volkspolizei during his tenure. Dickel's term ended on 18 November 1989 when he was dismissed as a result of the atmosphere of change and reform in the country which began leading up to German reunification. He was succeeded by Lothar Ahrendt as interior minister. In December 1989 Dickel retired from politics.

Death
After a long illness Dickel died in Berlin on 23 October 1993. He was 79.

Awards
Dickel was the recipient of the Order of Karl Marx which was awarded to him in June 1985 on the occasion of the 40th anniversary of the German People's Police.

References

External links

20th-century German politicians
1913 births
1993 deaths
Army generals of the National People's Army
Communist Party of Germany politicians
German emigrants to the Soviet Union
German people of the Spanish Civil War
Government ministers of East Germany
International Brigades personnel
Members of the 5th Volkskammer
Members of the 6th Volkskammer
Members of the 7th Volkskammer
Members of the 8th Volkskammer
Members of the 9th Volkskammer
Members of the Central Committee of the Socialist Unity Party of Germany
Politicians from Wuppertal
People condemned by Nazi courts
People from the Rhine Province
Recipients of the Order of Lenin
Recipients of the Order of the Red Banner
Recipients of the Patriotic Order of Merit (honor clasp)
Recipients of the Scharnhorst Order
Rotfrontkämpferbund members